U.N. Gunasekera (1922–2008), was a Sri Lankan civil engineer. He is a notable Sri Lankan civil engineer. He revolutionized engineering in Sri Lanka through his construction of high-rise buildings, including Sri Lanka's first five-star hotel (the Ceylon Inter-Continental) and its largest five-star hotel (the Cinnamon Grand), among various other projects.

Early life 
He studied at the Royal College, Colombo. Having completed the University of Cambridge Higher Diploma, he graduated from the University of London with a degree in Engineering and qualifying as a Chartered Engineer.

Civil engineering
Gunasekera developed a large construction business that captured a large portion of the market share. He was the first Sri Lankan engineer to build high-rise buildings. By initiating the construction of high rise buildings in Sri Lanka, he played a role in the economic and social development of Sri Lanka. In 1995, he was the only pre-qualified Sri Lankan engineer to bid for the 2.6 billion Marriott renovation of the Galle Face Hotel. He was named one of the five billionaires of Sri Lanka in 1998, prior to his retirement.

In addition to his construction ventures owned other commercial enterprises, such as the Glass House Health Center and Diagnostic Laboratory, a printing press, and a food manufacturing company. He was a prominent real estate mogul, having invested in a famed billion-rupee multi-acre property in Sri Lanka's capital. He developed many influential friendships, including with Sirimavo Bandaranaike and Ranasinghe Premadasa.

Projects
 Bank headquarters
 Hatton National Bank
 Hotels
 Ceylon Inter-Continental
 Lanka Oberoi aka Cinnamon Grand, including all 3 stages and 600 rooms
 Habarana Lodge and Mount Lavinia Hotel Extension
 Political party headquarters
 SLFP
 UNP
 Places of worship
 Cathedral of Christ the Living Savior
 Shopping malls
 Welikada Plaza
 YMBA
 Apartment complexes
 Police
 Office complexes
 People's Park Complex
 Auditoriums
 Bishop's College Auditorium
 Office buildings
 Hemas
 Headquarters for the Armed Forces
 National Armed Reserve
 Air Force
 National Intelligence Bureau
 Factory buildings
 Ceylon Glass Company
 Academic headquarters
 Institution of Engineers
 Institute of Chartered Accountants
 Institute of Business Management
 University buildings
 Science Faculty, University of Colombo
 Arts Faculty, University of Colombo
 Warehouses
 Aitken Spence
 Ferntea
Houses
 Sirimavo Bandaranaike's

Recognition 
Gunasekera was elected Fellow and President of the Institute of Engineers, Sri Lanka for five consecutive years, later serving as the chairman of its Board of Trustees. In 2006, he was awarded membership of the Institution of Structural Engineers and life membership of the National Construction Association (whose presidency he declined), in recognition of his professional excellence. He also received an award for 50 years of construction activity from the World Institute of Engineers.

He was also the President of Ceylonese Rugby & Football Club, Vice-President of the Sinhalese Sports Club and Vice-President of the Royal College Union.

Personal life 
He is the grandson of Gate Mudaliyar Abraham Mendis Gunasekera Wijaya Sri Wardana, a literary figure and the founder of the Sinhala-English Dictionary, and the great-grandson of Mudaliyar Bastian Mendis Gunasekera.

Gunasekera married Sita de Silva, daughter of Sir Ernest de Silva and Lady Evadne De Silva. They had three children, Srimani who became a Doctor, son Dhammika,  who became an engineer and younger daughter, Sushila, was a prominent tennis player in the early 1970s before attending university to study architecture.

Gunasekera was a strong Buddhist and was one of the largest contributors to charities in Sri Lanka. He constructed the Sambodhi Vihara in Colombo.

References

External links
 The Gunasekera ancestry

1922 births
2008 deaths
Sri Lankan Buddhists
Sinhalese engineers
Sinhalese businesspeople
Sri Lankan philanthropists
Alumni of the University of London
Alumni of Royal College, Colombo
20th-century philanthropists